Bergern im Dunkelsteinerwald is a town in the district of Krems-Land in the Austrian state of Lower Austria.

Population

References

Cities and towns in Krems-Land District